The list of University of Strathclyde people includes notable graduates, professors, and administrators affiliated with the University of Strathclyde.

Principals & Vice Chancellors

 Samuel Curran (1964-1981; Curran previously served as Principal of the Royal College of Science and Technology from 1959-64)
 Graham Hills (1981-1991)
 John Arbuthnott (1991-2001)
 Andrew Hamnett (2001-2009)
 Jim McDonald (2009- )

Academics

Alumni

References 

       
Strathclyde